David "Dai" Lewis Jones (26 March 1900 – 16 December 1968) was a Welsh rugby union, and professional rugby league footballer who played in the 1920s and 1930s.

Playing career

International honours
Jones won caps for Wales (RU) while at Newport RFC in 1926 against England, and Scotland, and in 1927 against Ireland, France, and England.

Change of codes
Jones played in all 3 rows of the pack for Newport, he played for Newport against the New Zealand Māori on Thursday 21 October 1926, he played for Wales (RU) against England in the Five Nations Championship on 15 January 1927, and less than one month later, he made his début (alongside Eddie Dowdall (also from Newport RFC), and Roy Kinnear) for Wigan (RL) in the 51-11 victory over Pemberton Rovers in the 1926–27 Challenge Cup first-round match at Central Park, Wigan on Saturday 12 February 1927, he scored his first try for Wigan in the 20-15 victory over Salford at Central Park, Wigan on Tuesday 19 April 1927, he scored last try for Wigan in the 7-20 defeat by Hull F.C. at The Boulevard, Hull on Saturday 30 March 1929, he played his last match for Wigan 0-15 defeat by Salford at The Willows, Salford on Wednesday 17 April 1929.

References

External links

Search for "Jones" at rugbyleagueproject.org
Profile at blackandambers.co.uk
 (archived by archive.is) Profile at blackandambers.co.uk* (archived by web.archive.org)
 (archived by web.archive.org) Profile at blackandambers.co.uk

1900 births
1968 deaths
Ebbw Vale RFC players
Footballers who switched code
Leigh Leopards players
Newport RFC players
Risca RFC players
Rugby league locks
Rugby league players from Gwynedd
Rugby league props
Rugby league second-rows
Rugby union players from Gwynedd
Rugby union props
Wales international rugby union players
Welsh rugby league players
Welsh rugby union players
Wigan Warriors players